Tân Hòa is a commune (xã) and village in the Buôn Đôn District of Đắk Lắk Province, Vietnam. The commune covers an area of 56.98 square kilometres and as of 2001 had a population of 8621 people.

References

Communes of Đắk Lắk province
Populated places in Đắk Lắk province